

Current

Play-by-play 
 Chris Cuthbert: 1984–2004, 2020–present
 Rick Ball: 2011–present
 John Shorthouse: 2014–present
 John Bartlett: 2018–present
 Harnarayan Singh: 2021–present
 Jack Michaels: 2021–present
 Rob Faulds: 2021–present
 Mike Luck: 2021–present

Punjabi
 Harnarayan Singh: 2008–present

Colour commentators 
 Craig Simpson: 2007–present
 Garry Galley: 2007–present
 Greg Millen: 1995–1998, 1999–present
 Louie DeBrusk: 2016–present
 John Garrett: 1986–1998, 2006–2008, 2014–present
 Cassie Campbell-Pascall: 2006–present

Punjabi
 Harpreet Pandher: 2014–present
 Randip Janda: 2014–present

Rinkside reporters 
 Cassie Campbell-Pascall: 2006–present
 Scott Oake: 1988–present
 Christine Simpson: 2014–present
 Kyle Bukauskas: 2016–present
 Dan Murphy: 2016–present
Shawn Mackenzie: 2019–present
Caroline Cameron: 2018-present

Studio hosts 
 Ron MacLean: 1986–2014, 2016–present

Studio analysts 
 Elliotte Friedman: 2012–present
 Kelly Hrudey: 1998–present
 Kevin Bieksa: 2019–present
 Jennifer Botterill: 2020–present

Current broadcast teams 
Prior to the 2014–15 season, Hockey Night in Canada was split regionally on various CBC stations. As of the 2022–23 season, it is now split with CBC, Citytv, and selected Sportsnet channels. Before Sportsnet acquired national NHL broadcast rights, CBC used to have fixed broadcast teams. After Sportsnet acquired the rights to the NHL and Hockey Night, the quantity of nationally televised games have increased and there are no fixed broadcast teams. Sportsnet has mixed in its own broadcasters with some of the original crew and they all shuffle weekly for which Canadian market team they do play-by-play and colour commentary they do.

Former

Play-by-play 
 Dean Brown: 1998–2014
 Bruce Buchanan: 1987–1989
 Bob Cole: 1973–2019
 Ken Daniels: 1992–1997
 Danny Gallivan: 1952–1984
 Bill Hewitt: 1958–1981
 Foster Hewitt: 1952–1958
 Jim Hughson: 1985–1986, 2005–2021
 Dick Irvin Jr.: 1984–1999
 Dan Kelly: 1977–1980
 Mark Lee: 1997–2014
 Jiggs McDonald: 1995–1998
 Kevin Quinn: 2014–2020
 Dave Randorf: 2014–2020
 Jim Robson: 1970–1985
 Paul Romanuk: 2014–2018
 Don Wittman: 1979–2007

Punjabi
 Parminder Singh: 2008–2010
 Bhupinder Hundal: 2014–2018

Colour commentators 
 Scotty Bowman: 1987–1990
 Guy Carbonneau: 2009–2010
 Don Cherry: 1980–1984
 Marc Crawford: 1998–1999, 2008–2009
 Keith Dancy: 1952–1966
 John Davidson: 1983–1986, 1995–2004
 Jack Dennett: 1970–1971 (Vancouver home games)
 Gary Dornhoefer: 1978–1987
 Elmer Ferguson
 John Ferguson Sr.: 1973–1975
 Patrick Flatley: 1998–2000
 Bob Goldham: 1960–1979
 Bill Good: 1971–1978
 Brian Hayward: 1995–2004
 Glenn Healy: 2001–2004, 2009–2016
 Foster Hewitt: 1958–1961
 Kelly Hrudey: 1998–2014
 Bobby Hull: 1980–1983
 Dick Irvin Jr.: 1966–1999
 Mike Johnson: 2014–2016
 Dan Kelly: 1966–1967
 Don Marshall: 1977–1980
 Red Storey: 1976–1979
 Pit Martin: 1979–1980
 Brian McFarlane: 1964–1980
 Howie Meeker: 1969–1987
 Lou Nanne: 1979
 Harry Neale: 1986–2008
 Bobby Orr: 1977–1980
 Jim Peplinski: 1990–1997
 Gerry Pinder: 1978–1981
 Daryl Reaugh: 2011–2013
 Mickey Redmond: 1980–1986
 Drew Remenda: 2006–2007
 Chico Resch: 1978, 1981, 1984, and 1988 playoffs
 Frank Selke Jr.: 1958–1960
 Steve Shutt: 1990–1994
 Ron Tugnutt: 2005–2007
 Kevin Weekes: 2009–2013

Punjabi
 Bhupinder Hundal: 2014–2018
 Amarinder Singh: 2010–2011
 Inderpreet Cumo: 2011–2014
 Bhola Chauhan: 2011–2014
 Surinder Chahal: 2014–2015

Rinkside reporters 
 David Amber: 2011–2016
 Steve Armitage: 1978–2008
 Chris Cuthbert: 1984–1993
 Ken Daniels: 1989–1997
 Elliotte Friedman: 2003–2012
 Martine Gaillard: 1998–2004
 Brenda Irving: 2001–2006
 Jeff Marek: 2009–2011
 Andi Petrillo: 2011–2014
 Mitch Peacock: 2010–2014
 Bruce Rainnie: 2003–2014
 Scott Russell: 1989–2003, 2005–2006
 John Wells: 1979–1984

Studio hosts 
 David Amber: 2016-2022
 Mike Anscombe: 1973–1976
 Steve Armitage: 1978–2008
 Ward Cornell: 1958–1971
 Ted Darling: 1968–1970
 Jack Dennett: 1959–1975
 Johnny Esaw: 1959–1960
 Tom Foley: 1957–1960
 Bill Good Jr.: 1970–1978
 Dave Hodge: 1971–1987
 Dick Irvin Jr.: 1976–1999
 Dan Kelly: 1967–1968, 1978–1980
 Terry Kielty: 1959–1960
 Brian McFarlane: 1970–1991
 Wes McKnight: 1952–1958
 Dave Reynolds: 1971–1978
 Ted Reynolds: 1970–1980
 Scott Russell: 1989–2003, 2005–2006
 Lloyd Saunders: 1959–1960
 Frank Selke Jr.: 1960–1967
 George Stroumboulopoulos: 2014–2016
 Jack Wells: 1959–1960
 John Wells: 1979–1984
 Scott Young: 1957–1960

Studio analysts 
 Brian Burke: 2019–2021
 Rick Bowness: 1993–1996 playoffs
 Don Cherry: 1981–2019
 Damien Cox: 2014–2016
 Glenn Healy: 2001–2004, 2009–2016
 Nick Kypreos: 2014–2019
 Howie Meeker: 1969–1987
 Mike Milbury: 2008–2012
 Scott Morrison: 2009–2011
 Babe Pratt: 1970–1980
 P. J. Stock: 2007–2016
 Red Storey: 1970–1977
 Kevin Weekes: 2013–2014

References

See also
List of Canadian Broadcasting Corporation personalities
List of NHL on Sportsnet commentators

Hockey Night in Canada
CBC Sports
Sportsnet